François Boulay is a Canadian film and television screenwriter, best known as cowriter with Jean-Marc Vallée of the 2005 film C.R.A.Z.Y. and as a writer for the Quebec television drama series Providence.

Boulay and Vallée won the Genie Award for Best Original Screenplay at the 26th Genie Awards, and the Jutra Award for Best Screenplay at the 8th Jutra Awards.

C.R.A.Z.Y. was based in part on Boulay's own reminiscences about growing up gay.

He is a graduate of the National Theatre School of Canada.

References

External links

Canadian screenwriters in French
Canadian television writers
Gay screenwriters
Canadian gay writers
Writers from Quebec
French Quebecers
Canadian LGBT screenwriters
National Theatre School of Canada alumni
Living people
Best Screenplay Genie and Canadian Screen Award winners
Canadian male screenwriters
21st-century Canadian screenwriters
Canadian male television writers
Year of birth missing (living people)
21st-century Canadian LGBT people